Punnasseri Nambi Neelakanta Sharma (1858–1934) was a renowned  Sanskrit scholar and teacher of Kerala, India. He was born on 17 June 1858 in Pattambi in Palakkad district to a Moosad family, Narayanan  Nambi and Achuthath Nangayya Antharjanam. He learned Sanskrit in the customary way and mastered the branches of traditional knowledge of  Vyakaranam (grammar), Alankaram (aesthetics), Vaidyam (medicine) and Jyothisham (astrology).

In 1888 he started  'Saraswathodyothini'  a center  for Sanskrit teaching  which later became Sree Neelakanta Government Sanskrit College Pattambi. He also founded 'Vijnanachinthamani' printing press and 'Vijnanachinthamani' hospital. He received various titles and honours from the Maharajas of Travancore and Cochin states and has chaired many academic bodies.

He died on 14 September 1934.

Major works  
 Jyothisasthra Subodhini
 Panchabodha vyakhya
 Prasnamargathinu uparathnashikha vyakhyanam
 Chamalkara chinthamani vyakhya
 Mahisha mangalabhana vyakhya
 Sreekrishna vilasa vyakhya

References

External links

Malayali people
Writers from Kerala
Malayalam-language writers
Indian Sanskrit scholars
1934 deaths
1858 births
People from Palakkad district
Scholars from Kerala
19th-century Indian scholars
20th-century Indian scholars